Eucalyptus ornata, commonly known as silver mallet, ornamental silver mallet or ornate mallet, is a species of mallet or tree that is endemic to Western Australia. It has smooth, grey bark, lance-shaped adult leaves, flower buds in groups of nine or eleven, creamy white flowers and broadly conical to hemispherical fruit.

Description
Eucalyptus ornata is a tree that typically grows to a height of  but does not form a lignotuber.

Taxonomy
Eucalyptus ornata was first formally described in 1985 by Michael Crisp in the journal Nuytsia from material collected by Joan Taylor and Peter Ollerenshaw near Kondinin in 1983. The specific epithet (ornata) is from the Latin ornatus meaning "handsome" or "showy".

Distribution and habitat
Silver mallet grows in woodland on low hills and ridges to the east and north-east of Kondinin.

Conservation status
This eucalypt is classified as "Priority Three" by the Government of Western Australia Department of Parks and Wildlife, meaning that it is poorly known and known from only a few locations but is not under imminent threat.

See also
List of Eucalyptus species

References

Eucalypts of Western Australia
Trees of Australia
ornata
Myrtales of Australia
Plants described in 1985
Taxa named by Michael Crisp